Eladio Vaschetto was a former Argentine football player. He played with Club Atlético River Plate, Colo Colo and Puebla FC  in Mexico.

Biography 
Eladio Vaschetto was a former Argentine football player. He started his professional career with the Argentine club Club Atlético River Plate  in 1936 where he managed to win 2 league titles in 1936 and 1939.
After the 1939 tournament he transferred to Chile were after a few years he managed to sign with top futbol club Colo Colo. In 1943 after a short stay with Colo Colo, he signed with newly created Puebla FC  in Mexico. Vaschetto was the first player to score in the club's history in 1944 against Atlas. During his 3 years at the Mexican club he managed to score 21 goles and helped the club win its first Copa Mexico title in the 1944-45 tournament. After the 1946-47 tournament he retired and soon relocated to Portugal where he managed F.C. Porto  during the 1947–48 and the 1951-52 tournaments.

Honors 
Club Atlético River Plate 
 Argentine Primera División :(2) 1936, 1939

Puebla FC 
 Copa Mexico :(1) 1945

References 

Argentine footballers
Argentine expatriate footballers
Rosario Central footballers
Club Atlético River Plate footballers
Colo-Colo footballers
Club Puebla players
Chilean Primera División players
Argentine Primera División players
Liga MX players
Expatriate footballers in Chile
Expatriate footballers in Mexico
Association football forwards
Year of birth missing